Protein FAM186B is a protein that in humans is encoded by the FAM186B gene.

References

Further reading